Begum Shehnaz Sheikh is a Pakistani Australian former politician who served as member of the National Assembly of Pakistan before her membership termination.

Political career
She was elected to the National Assembly of Pakistan as a candidate of Pakistan Peoples Party on a seat reserved for women from Punjab in the 1988 Pakistani general election.

She was re-elected to the National Assembly of Pakistan as a candidate of Pakistan Peoples Party on a seat reserved for women from Punjab in the 2002 Pakistani general election.

She was re-elected to the National Assembly of Pakistan as a candidate of Pakistan Muslim League (Q) on a seat reserved for women from Punjab in the 2008 Pakistani general election. Her National Assembly membership was suspended in 2012 by the Supreme Court of Pakistan due to her Australian citizenship.

References

Living people
Australian people of Punjabi descent
Pakistani MNAs 2008–2013
Pakistani MNAs 2002–2007
Pakistani MNAs 1988–1990
Pakistan People's Party MNAs
Pakistan Muslim League (Q) MNAs
Punjabi people
Year of birth missing (living people)
Pakistani emigrants to Australia
Naturalised citizens of Australia
Expelled members of the National Assembly of Pakistan